

People 
An Exonian is a member (or former member) of one of the following educational establishments:

 A student or graduate of the University of Exeter, England
 A student or graduate of Exeter College, Oxford, England
 A current or past student of Exeter School, England
 A current or past student of Phillips Exeter Academy, US

Or a native of one of the following places:
the city of Exeter, England.
the town of Exeter, Ontario, Canada.
the town of Exeter, New Hampshire, US.
the former Village of Exeter, in Green County, Wisconsin

Other uses 
 The Exonian, the student newspaper of Phillips Exeter Academy